Mineralnye Vody (Min-Vody) (lit. mineral waters) is a town in Stavropol Krai, Russia, located along the Kuma River and the main rail line between Rostov-on-Don in Russia and Baku in Azerbaijan. Population:

History
The town owes its birth to the construction of the Rostov-Vladikavkaz Railway, the construction of which was completed in 1875. In 1878, the village which developed around the construction was officially recognized and named Sultanovsky. In 1906 the name was changed to Illarionovsky, in honor of Count I. I. Vorontsov-Dashkov, a local nobleman. In October 1921, at the end of the civil war when Soviet rule had been established, the name was again changed to Mineralnye Vody and town status was granted. The new town had a population of around 14.000 people. It was occupied by Nazi Germany between 10 August 1942 and 11 January 1943 during World War II.

Administrative and municipal status
Within the framework of administrative divisions, Mineralnye Vody serves as the administrative center of Mineralovodsky District, even though it is not a part of it. As an administrative division, it is incorporated separately as the town of krai significance of Mineralnye Vody—an administrative unit with the status equal to that of the districts. As a municipal division, the territories of the town of krai significance of Mineralnye Vody and of Mineralovodsky District have been incorporated as Mineralovodsky Urban Okrug since June 7, 2015. Prior to that, the district was incorporated as Mineralovodsky Municipal District, with the town of krai significance of Mineralnye Vody being incorporated within it as Mineralnye Vody Urban Settlement.

Economy
The town serves as a gateway to Caucasian mineral waters. It is served by the Mineralnye Vody Airport, connecting the town with some Russian and international destinations. It is connected by R217 highway (Russia) to Krasnodar and Derbent. The R217 forms part of European route E50.

Climate
Mineralnye Vody's climate classified as humid continental (Köppen climate classification Dfa).

References

Notes

Sources

External links
Yad Vashem. The murder of the Jews of Mineralnye Vody during World War II.

Cities and towns in Stavropol Krai
Spa towns in Russia